is a Japanese actor. He was born in Beijing and  raised in  Yokohama. In 1962, Fuji joined Nikkatsu Company and began his acting career with small roles in Nikkatsu film. In 1968, Fuji married actress Izumi Ashikawa. He gained popularity through his role in Jikandesuyo on TBS.

He has starred in two films (Empire of Passion and Bright Future) that have been entered into the Cannes Film Festival.

Fuji co-starred in Kiyoshi Kurosawa's Bright Future with Tadanobu Asano and Joe Odagiri. In 2005, he won the Golden Goblet Award for Best Actor for his work in the  Village Photobook. In 2015, Fuji won best actor award of Tokyo Sports Film Award for his work in the Ryuzo and the Seven Henchmen.

Selected filmography

Film

 Black Sun (1964)
 Taking The Castle (1965)
 Massacre Gun (1967)
 Gappa: The Triphibian Monster (1967)
 Monument to the Girls' Corps (1968)
 Moeru Tairiku (1968)
 Daikanbu Nagurikomi (1969)
 Savage Wolf Pack (1969)
 Retaliation (1968)
 Alleycat Rock: Female Boss (1970)
 Stray Cat Rock: Sex Hunter (1970)
 Stray Cat Rock: Wild Jumbo (1970)
 Stray Cat Rock: Machine Animal (1970)
 Gyakuen Mitsusakazuki (1971)
 In the Realm of the Senses (1976)
 Empire of Passion (1978)
 PP Rider (1983)
 Keshin (1986)
 Bright Future (2003)
 The Man in White (2003)
 Rikidōzan (2004)
 Umizaru (2004)
 Kamataki (2005)
 Village Photobook  (2005)
 Midnight Eagle (2007)
 Shiawase no Kaori (2008)
 Pandemic (2009)
 Soup Opera (2010)
 Hoshi Mamoru Inu (2011)
 Ogawa no Hotori (2011)
 Hayabusa: Harukanaru Kikan (2012)
 Zakurozaka no Adauchi (2014)
 Ryuzo and the Seven Henchmen (2015) – Ryuzo
 My Dad and Mr. Ito (2016) – Aya's father
 Radiance (2017)
 Dad, Chibi is Gone (2019)
 Aircraft Carrier Ibuki (2019) – Keiji Wakui
 The Stormy Family (2019)
 Go! Go! Sakura Club (2023) – Momojiro Oda

Television
 Taiyō ni Hoero! (1973) (ep.46, Guest)
 Katsu Kaishū (1974) – Hijikata Toshizō (Taiga drama)
 Daitsuiseki (1978)
 Pro Hunter (1981)
 Kazoku no Uta (2012)
 Kabukimono Keiji (2015) – Maeda Keiji
 Yasuragi no Sato (2017) – Takai
 Okaeri Mone (2021) – Tatsumi Nagaura

References

External links
 
 
 

1941 births
Living people
Japanese male film actors
Male actors from Beijing
20th-century Japanese male actors
21st-century Japanese male actors
Chinese male film actors